The Southern constituency (No.12) is a Russian legislative constituency covering the southwestern areas of Dagestan. Until 2003 the constituency covered the entirety of Southern Dagestan, however, due to population growth in the region Buynaksk constituency lost its Caspian Sea coast part to newly-established Derbent constituency.

Members elected

Election results

1993

|-
! colspan=2 style="background-color:#E9E9E9;text-align:left;vertical-align:top;" |Candidate
! style="background-color:#E9E9E9;text-align:left;vertical-align:top;" |Party
! style="background-color:#E9E9E9;text-align:right;" |Votes
! style="background-color:#E9E9E9;text-align:right;" |%
|-
|style="background-color:"|
|align=left|Gamid Gamidov
|align=left|Independent
|
|43.86%
|-
|style="background-color:"|
|align=left|Gamidulakh Magomedov
|align=left|Independent
| -
|20.32%
|-
| colspan="5" style="background-color:#E9E9E9;"|
|- style="font-weight:bold"
| colspan="3" style="text-align:left;" | Total
| 
| 100%
|-
| colspan="5" style="background-color:#E9E9E9;"|
|- style="font-weight:bold"
| colspan="4" |Source:
|
|}

1995

|-
! colspan=2 style="background-color:#E9E9E9;text-align:left;vertical-align:top;" |Candidate
! style="background-color:#E9E9E9;text-align:left;vertical-align:top;" |Party
! style="background-color:#E9E9E9;text-align:right;" |Votes
! style="background-color:#E9E9E9;text-align:right;" |%
|-
|style="background-color:"|
|align=left|Ramazan Abdulatipov
|align=left|Independent
|
|45.87%
|-
|style="background-color:"|
|align=left|Marat Mekhtikhanov
|align=left|Communist Party
|
|18.02%
|-
|style="background-color:"|
|align=left|Shikhsefi Sefikhanov
|align=left|Independent
|
|9.53%
|-
|style="background-color:"|
|align=left|Magomed Radzhabov
|align=left|Independent
|
|7.37%
|-
|style="background-color:#FF4400"|
|align=left|Sufiyan Ismailov
|align=left|Party of Workers' Self-Government
|
|2.10%
|-
|style="background-color:"|
|align=left|Asadula Nasrulayev
|align=left|Liberal Democratic Party
|
|0.70%
|-
|style="background-color:#000000"|
|colspan=2 |against all
|
|0.00%
|-
| colspan="5" style="background-color:#E9E9E9;"|
|- style="font-weight:bold"
| colspan="3" style="text-align:left;" | Total
| 
| 100%
|-
| colspan="5" style="background-color:#E9E9E9;"|
|- style="font-weight:bold"
| colspan="4" |Source:
|
|}

1998

|-
! colspan=2 style="background-color:#E9E9E9;text-align:left;vertical-align:top;" |Candidate
! style="background-color:#E9E9E9;text-align:left;vertical-align:top;" |Party
! style="background-color:#E9E9E9;text-align:right;" |Votes
! style="background-color:#E9E9E9;text-align:right;" |%
|-
|style="background-color:"|
|align=left|Magomedfazil Azizov
|align=left|Independent
|
|54.00%
|-
| colspan="5" style="background-color:#E9E9E9;"|
|- style="font-weight:bold"
| colspan="3" style="text-align:left;" | Total
| -
| 100%
|-
| colspan="5" style="background-color:#E9E9E9;"|
|- style="font-weight:bold"
| colspan="4" |Source:
|
|}

1999

|-
! colspan=2 style="background-color:#E9E9E9;text-align:left;vertical-align:top;" |Candidate
! style="background-color:#E9E9E9;text-align:left;vertical-align:top;" |Party
! style="background-color:#E9E9E9;text-align:right;" |Votes
! style="background-color:#E9E9E9;text-align:right;" |%
|-
|style="background-color:"|
|align=left|Gadzhimurad Omarov
|align=left|Independent
|
|27.63%
|-
|style="background-color:"|
|align=left|Gamid Askerkhanov
|align=left|Our Home – Russia
|
|18.90%
|-
|style="background-color:#3B9EDF"|
|align=left|Magomed Tolboyev
|align=left|Fatherland – All Russia
|
|15.23%
|-
|style="background-color:"|
|align=left|Ruslan Magomedragimov
|align=left|Independent
|
|13.03%
|-
|style="background-color:"|
|align=left|Magoma Saidov
|align=left|Independent
|
|8.77%
|-
|style="background-color:"|
|align=left|Magomed Gadzhiyev
|align=left|Independent
|
|5.13%
|-
|style="background-color:"|
|align=left|Shamil Taygibov
|align=left|Independent
|
|4.12%
|-
|style="background-color:"|
|align=left|Grigory Kuyevda
|align=left|Independent
|
|2.04%
|-
|style="background-color:"|
|align=left|Kumsiyat Kazanatova
|align=left|Independent
|
|0.48%
|-
|style="background-color:"|
|align=left|Makhach Aliyev
|align=left|Independent
|
|0.45%
|-
|style="background-color:#7C273A"|
|align=left|Magomed Chaguchiyev
|align=left|Movement in Support of the Army
|
|0.17%
|-
|style="background-color:"|
|align=left|Khizri Kilyaskhanov
|align=left|Yabloko
|
|0.01%
|-
|style="background-color:#000000"|
|colspan=2 |against all
|
|1.17%
|-
| colspan="5" style="background-color:#E9E9E9;"|
|- style="font-weight:bold"
| colspan="3" style="text-align:left;" | Total
| 
| 100%
|-
| colspan="5" style="background-color:#E9E9E9;"|
|- style="font-weight:bold"
| colspan="4" |Source:
|
|}

2003

|-
! colspan=2 style="background-color:#E9E9E9;text-align:left;vertical-align:top;" |Candidate
! style="background-color:#E9E9E9;text-align:left;vertical-align:top;" |Party
! style="background-color:#E9E9E9;text-align:right;" |Votes
! style="background-color:#E9E9E9;text-align:right;" |%
|-
|style="background-color:"|
|align=left|Magomed Gadzhiyev
|align=left|Independent
|
|62.70%
|-
|style="background-color:#FFD700"|
|align=left|Gadzhimurad Omarov (incumbent)
|align=left|People's Party
|
|33.64%
|-
|style="background-color:"|
|align=left|Marat Daniyalov
|align=left|Independent
|
|0.82%
|-
|style="background-color:#4D8D39"|
|align=left|Magomed Shamilov
|align=left|Genuine Patriots of Russia
|
|0.13%
|-
|style="background-color:"|
|align=left|Dzhamaldin Shamkhalov
|align=left|Independent
|
|0.09%
|-
|style="background-color:#000000"|
|colspan=2 |against all
|
|1.43%
|-
| colspan="5" style="background-color:#E9E9E9;"|
|- style="font-weight:bold"
| colspan="3" style="text-align:left;" | Total
| 
| 100%
|-
| colspan="5" style="background-color:#E9E9E9;"|
|- style="font-weight:bold"
| colspan="4" |Source:
|
|}

2016

|-
! colspan=2 style="background-color:#E9E9E9;text-align:left;vertical-align:top;" |Candidate
! style="background-color:#E9E9E9;text-align:left;vertical-align:top;" |Party
! style="background-color:#E9E9E9;text-align:right;" |Votes
! style="background-color:#E9E9E9;text-align:right;" |%
|-
|style="background-color: " |
|align=left|Abdulmazhid Magramov
|align=left|United Russia
|
|68.71%
|-
|style="background-color:"|
|align=left|Abusupyan Kharkharov
|align=left|Independent
|
|26.87%
|-
|style="background-color:"|
|align=left|Ibragimgadzhi Ibragimgadzhiyev
|align=left|Patriots of Russia
|
|0.62%
|-
|style="background-color:"|
|align=left|Khadzhimurad Gadzhiyev
|align=left|Communist Party
|
|0.56%
|-
|style="background-color:"|
|align=left|Gayiberg Abdurakhmanov
|align=left|The Greens
|
|0.36%
|-
|style="background-color:"|
|align=left|Dada Umarov
|align=left|Rodina
|
|0.35%
|-
|style="background-color:"|
|align=left|Iraskhan Dzhafarov
|align=left|Liberal Democratic Party
|
|0.31%
|-
|style="background:"| 
|align=left|Albert Esedov
|align=left|Yabloko
|
|0.31%
|-
|style="background:"| 
|align=left|Yulia Yuzik
|align=left|People's Freedom Party
|
|0.25%
|-
|style="background-color:"|
|align=left|Sergey Akulinichev
|align=left|A Just Russia
|
|0.20%
|-
|style="background-color:"|
|align=left|Vladimir Dzhikkayev
|align=left|Communists of Russia
|
|0.19%
|-
| colspan="5" style="background-color:#E9E9E9;"|
|- style="font-weight:bold"
| colspan="3" style="text-align:left;" | Total
| 
| 100%
|-
| colspan="5" style="background-color:#E9E9E9;"|
|- style="font-weight:bold"
| colspan="4" |Source:
|
|}

2021

|-
! colspan=2 style="background-color:#E9E9E9;text-align:left;vertical-align:top;" |Candidate
! style="background-color:#E9E9E9;text-align:left;vertical-align:top;" |Party
! style="background-color:#E9E9E9;text-align:right;" |Votes
! style="background-color:#E9E9E9;text-align:right;" |%
|-
|style="background-color:"|
|align=left|Dzhamaladin Gasanov
|align=left|United Russia
|
|73.37%
|-
|style="background-color:"|
|align=left|Gadzhimurad Omarov
|align=left|A Just Russia — For Truth
|
|14.41%
|-
|style="background-color:"|
|align=left|Akhmednabi Magomedov
|align=left|Communist Party
|
|4.50%
|-
|style="background-color:"|
|align=left|Shakhlar Agakhanov
|align=left|Rodina
|
|1.56%
|-
|style="background-color: " |
|align=left|Sharip Aliyev
|align=left|New People
|
|1.26%
|-
|style="background-color: "|
|align=left|Gabibulla Bagamayev
|align=left|Party of Pensioners
|
|1.23%
|-
|style="background-color:"|
|align=left|Abdulgamid Abdullayev
|align=left|Liberal Democratic Party
|
|1.15%
|-
|style="background-color:"|
|align=left|Aznaur Gadzhimirzoyev
|align=left|The Greens
|
|0.96%
|-
|style="background-color:"|
|align=left|Albert Esedov
|align=left|Yabloko
|
|0.53%
|-
| colspan="5" style="background-color:#E9E9E9;"|
|- style="font-weight:bold"
| colspan="3" style="text-align:left;" | Total
| 
| 100%
|-
| colspan="5" style="background-color:#E9E9E9;"|
|- style="font-weight:bold"
| colspan="4" |Source:
|
|}

Notes

References 

Russian legislative constituencies
Politics of Dagestan